Caccia e Pesca (Hunting and Fishing) is an Italy-based premium television channel about hunting and fishing.

External links 
 

RCS MediaGroup
Television channels in Italy
Television channels and stations established in 2004
Italian-language television stations